Paul Obazele is a Nigerian actor, philanthropist, and movie producer who once served as the president of the Association of Movie Producers (AMP) and at the end of his tenure as president of Association of Movie Producers (AMP) he was appointed the president of Edo Film Makers Association (EFMA). Obazele is the founder of Legends of Nollywood Awards (LNA). He was named “one of the most consistent faces on television” by the editorial team of TV Guide which is a quarterly publication of the Nigerian Television Authority.

Early life and education
Obazele who hails from Edo State a south-south geographical region of Nigeria occupied predominantly by the minority tribes in Nigeria was born in Lagos state. Obazele more precisely is from Esan in Edo State and is the 5th born child in his family. Obazele attended secondary education at Anglican Grammar School, Ubulu Ukwu in Delta State. Where he obtained his West African Senior School Certificate from. Obazele obtained a degree in Business Administration from Auchi Polytechnic.

Career
Obazele’s passion for acting and movie-making became ignited when he was an undergraduate at Auchi Polytechnic. Obazele revealed in an interview that his father vehemently opposed his goal to become an actor. Obazele due to objections from his father temporarily dismissed his goal of being an actor and instead, secured a daytime job at a Production company. Obazele would later go against his father’s orders and in 1996 officially join the Nigerian movie industry and debut his acting career with the movie titled Shadow of Death a movie directed by Bolaji Dawudu in which he played the lead role. In 1999 he was already an established actor and started to direct movies. A Guardian media publication in 2016 published a piece which stated Obazele had featured in 200 movies.

Award
Obazele was awarded the City People Movie Special Recognition Award at the City People Entertainment Awards.

Personal life
Obazele is married with children and when he isn’t working he spends his free time with his family. Obazele’s hobbies include watching films and listening to music.

Selected filmography
Night Bus To Lagos (2019)
Iyore (2015)
If Only (2014) 
Invasion 1897 (2014)
Political Control (2006)
Cry Of A Virgin (2006)
Family Affair (2006)
Power Must Change Hands (2006)
All My Heart (2005)
Hidden Treasures (2005)
Faithful Love (2004)
Life In New York (2004)
The Champ (2004)
Ashanti (2003)
Dangerous Babe (2003)
Last Weekend (2003)
Wanted Alive (2001)
Set-Up (2000)
Kòseégbé (1995) 
Black Maria (1994)

References

External links

Living people
21st-century Nigerian male actors
Male actors from Edo State
Year of birth missing (living people)
Auchi Polytechnic alumni
Male actors from Lagos State
Nigerian male film actors
20th-century Nigerian male actors
Nigerian film producers
Nigerian male television actors
Nigerian philanthropists
Nigerian humanitarians
Nigerian film award winners